(: One sings with joy about victory), 149,  is a church cantata by Johann Sebastian Bach. He composed the work in Leipzig for Michaelmas and first performed it on 29 September 1729. It is the last of his three extant cantatas for the feast.

Picander wrote the cantata's libretto, and published it in a 1728/29 cycle of cantata texts. The libretto opens with two verses from Psalm 118 and closes with the third stanza of Martin Schalling's "". The topic of the libretto aligns with the prescribed readings for the day from the Book of Revelation, Michael fighting the dragon. The closing Lutheran hymn stanza writes about a "sweet little angel", accompanying a soul in anticipation of the Last Judgment. 

The cantata has seven movements, and is scored festively with four vocal parts and a Baroque orchestra of three trumpets, timpani, three oboes, bassoon, strings and continuo. Bach derived the music of the opening chorus from his Hunting Cantata, composed already in 1713.

History and text 
Bach composed the cantata in Leipzig for the feast of St. Michael (Michaelmas); it is his third and last of his extant cantatas for the feast, a feast celebrating the archangel and all angels. The prescribed readings for St. Michael's Day were from the Book of Revelation, Michael fighting the dragon, and from the Gospel of Matthew, heaven belongs to the children and the angels see the face of God. St. Michael, the archangel, has a prominent position in Lutheranism, as in Judaism. John Eliot Gardiner, who conducted all of Bach's church cantatas in 2000 on the Bach Cantata Pilgrimage, notes that the Sanctus, composed for Christmas 1724 in close relation to the text by Isaiah, and much later integrated to Bach's Mass in B minor, shows the relevance of angels for Bach's Lutheranism.

The libretto was written by Christian Friedrich Henrici, better known as Picander, Bach began to work with him in 1725, and they collaborated notably on the major St Matthew Passion. Picander wrote his cantata texts, including this one, with Bach as the composer in mind. The poet included as the first movement two verses from a psalm and as the closing chorale the third stanza of Martin Schalling's hymn "". The Bach scholar Klaus Hofmann notes that battle scenes were often depicted in art and music. In the opening lines taken from a psalm, the battle of Michael against Satan is already won. Satan is mentioned only in the first movement. A focus of the later sequence of alternating arias and recitatives is on guardian angels seen as "holy watchmen". The libretto was published in the 1728/29 year of his collection . They appeared in quarterly volumes to help the congregation following the text.

Bach led the Thomanerchor in the first performance of the cantata in Leipzig on 29 September, either in 1728 or 1729.

Scoring and structure 
Bach structured the cantata in seven movements and scored it for four vocal soloists (soprano (S), alto (A), tenor (T) and bass (B)), a four-part choir, and a Baroque orchestra of three trumpets (Tr), timpani (Ti), three oboes (Ob), two violins (Vl), violas (Va), bassoon (Fg), violone (Vo), and basso continuo (Bc). The title of the autograph score reads simply: "J.N.J. Festo Michaelis. / Man singet mit Freuden etc. di I.S.Bach."

In the following table of the movements, the scoring and keys follow the Neue Bach-Ausgabe. The time signature is provided using the symbol for common time (4/4). The continuo, playing throughout, is not shown.

.

Music

1 
Bach based the music of the opening chorus, "" (There are joyful songs of victory), on the final movement of his secular Hunting Cantata, which had been his first cantata using "modern" recitatives and arias in 1713. The polyphonic movement is described by Simon Crouch as being a "high-octane start". Gardiner notes that in comparison to earlier works for the same occasion, this movement is "festive rather than combative". Bach reworked the earlier movement considerably to adjust from the court music context to joyful songs of victory: he replaced two horns with three trumpets and timpani, transposed the music from F major to D major, and expanded it "on every level", as Hofmann notes. The beginning of a different setting of the text hints at the fact that the idea to use the early music as a base was not planned from the start.

2 
The bass aria, "" (Power and strength be sung), is accompanied by two low instrumental melodies. It examines the conflict between God and Satan, and includes a very active continuo to represent "the fury of the battle". The imagery of a "great voice", as mentioned in the Book of Revelation, is used, announcing the Lamb "that has defeated and banished Satan".

3 
A short alto recitative, "" (I don't fear thousand enemies), was described as "tonally unstable".

4 
The soprano aria, "" (God's angels never yield), is lyrical and dancing. The string accompaniment uses parallel thirds and sixths. It is stylistically similar to a minuet, and is formally an adapted ternary structure.

5 
The tenor recitative, "" (I thank You), ends with an ascending phrase meant to represent an appeal to heaven.

6 
The duet aria for alto and tenor, "" (Be wakeful, you holy watchers), employs canon technique and a repeated interrupted cadence. Its introduction has been described as "the most athletic of bassoon lines". The tenor and alto voices repeat the opening bassoon figure in canon.

7 
The work ends with a harmonically complex four-part setting of the chorale, "" (Ah, Lord, let Your dear little angel). It is a prayer to be sent an angel to carry the soul in Abraham's Bosom, and a promise to praise God eternally. Bach's setting is remarkable for its final two bars: the trumpets and timpani create a "magnificent blaze of sound". Bach chose the same stanza of Schalling's chorale to end his St John Passion, in the work's first and last version.

Publication 
The cantata was first published in 1884 in the Bach-Gesellschaft Ausgabe (BGA).

Recordings 

The table is excerpted from the listing on the Bach Cantatas Website. Ensembles playing period instruments in historically informed performances are marked by green background.

See also 
 BWV 149/1a, formerly BWV Anh. 198 – "Concerto", an abandoned sketch for an alternative setting of the Cantata's opening movement?

References

Sources 
 
 BWV 149 Man singet mit Freuden vom Sieg: English translation, University of Vermont
 Luke Dahn: BWV 149.7 bach-chorales.com

Church cantatas by Johann Sebastian Bach
Psalm-related compositions by Johann Sebastian Bach
1728 compositions
1729 compositions